Stomphastis chalybacma is a moth of the family Gracillariidae. It is known from India, Indonesia (Sulawesi), Malaysia (West Malaysia and Sabah), Myanmar, Sri Lanka and Thailand.

The larvae feed on Caesalpinia decapetala, Caesalpinia pulcherrima and Samanea saman. They probably mine the leaves of their host plant.

References

Stomphastis
Moths of Asia